The Dnyanopasak College of Arts, Commerce, Science and Technology (DSM) is a degree college situated in the city of Parbhani. It was founded in 1984 by the Dnyanopasak Shikshan Mandal. There is a branch in Jintur taluka and Bori, Parbhani Village. The colleges are usually called as DSM College.

Junior college offer courses in Arts, Commerce, Science, and MCVC streams. The senior college offers Bachelor's degrees in 7 disciplines and Master's degrees in 21 disciplines, including Life Sciences, Mathematics, Physical Sciences, Computer Sciences, languages, Humanities, and Social Sciences.
It is located Near Zilla Parishad, on Jintur Road, Parbhani.

External links
official website

Parbhani
Universities and colleges in Maharashtra